Tsaghats Kar Monastery is a monastic complex located along the mountain foothills overlooking the Yeghegis River, between the villages of Yeghegis (6 km northeast) and Horbategh in the Vayots Dzor Province of Armenia. The monastery is located within walking distance of the fortress of Smbataberd. 

There are two groups of structures at the site that are separated by a distance of 200 meters (656 feet). The grouping to the west, now half-ruined, was constructed of rough-hewn basalt.

Within the complex of Tsaghats Kar is Surb Hovhannes church built in 989, Surb Karapet church of the 10th century, and many other structures that are in ruins.  Saint Karapet is a cupola hall type structure, with a sacristy in each of the four corners.  Numerous khachkars may be seen around the monastery as well.

There is a pipe-spring on the right a little after passing the river.

Gallery

References

Bibliography

External links 
 Armcamping.com: Tsaghats Kar Monastery (Article written in Armenian)
 Armeniapedia.org: Tsaghats Kar Monastery

Christian monasteries in Armenia
Tourist attractions in Vayots Dzor Province
Buildings and structures in Vayots Dzor Province